Lepidoptera of French Polynesia consist of both the butterflies and moths recorded from French Polynesia.

According to a recent estimate, there are a total of roughly 400 Lepidoptera species present on the islands of French Polynesia.

Butterflies

Hesperiidae
Badamia atrox collenettei Evans, 1934
Badamia exclamationis (Fabricius, 1775)

Lycaenidae
Catochrysops taitensis (Boisduval, 1832)
Hypojamides catochloris (Boisduval, 1832)
Jamides bochus (Stoll, 1782)
Jamides bochus ruruturi Riley, 1929
Lampides boeticus (Linnaeus, 1767)
Nacaduba tahitiensis Hara & Hirowatari, 1989
Ocaria ocrisia (Hewitson, 1868)
Petrelaea dana (de Nicéville, 1884)
Zizina labradus cheesmanae (Poulton & Riley, 1928)
Zizina otis (Fabricius, 1787)

Nymphalidae
Atella gaberti Guerin-Meneville, 1838
Atella marquesana Riley, 1935
Danaus plexippus (Linnaeus, 1758)
Diadema auge otahaiti Cheesman,
Euploea algae (Godart, 1819)
Euploea eleutho (Quoy & Gaimard, 1815)
Euploea helcita Boisduval, 1859
Euploea helcita walkeri Druce, 1890
Euploea lewinii Felder & Felder, 1865
Hypolimnas bolina (Linnaeus, 1758)
Hypolimnas bolina otaheitae Felder, 1862
Junonia villida (Fabricius, 1787)
Junonia villida longfieldae Riley, 1929
Junonia villida taitica Fruhstorfer, 1912
Libythea collenettei Poulton & Riley, 1928
Melanitis leda solandra (Fabricius, 1775)
Melanitis leda taitensis (Felder, 1862)
Phalanta marquesana Poulton & Riley, 1935
Taenaris phorcas phorcas (Westwood, 1851)
Vagrans egista (Cramer, 1780)
Vagrans gaberti Waterhouse, 1920
Vanessa itea (Fabricius, 1775)

Moths

Alucitidae
Alucita pselioxantha Meyrick, 1929

Arctiidae
Argina astrea (Drury, 1773)
Lambula erema Collenette, 1934
Utetheisa ornatrix (Linnaeus, 1758)
Utetheisa pulchella (Linnaeus, 1758)
Utetheisa pulchelloides Hampson, 1907

Carposinidae
Peragrarchis pelograpta (Meyrick, 1928)

Choreutidae
Anthophila chalcotoxa (Meyrick, 1886)
Anthophila chelaspis (Meyrick, 1928)

Copromorphidae
Dryanassa erebactis Meyrick 1936

Cosmopterigidae
Anatrachyntis incertulella (Walker, 1864)
Anatrachyntis tridigitella (Walsingham 1907)
Asymphorodes acerba Meyrick, 1928
Asymphorodes acritopterus J.F.G. Clarke, 1986
Asymphorodes acrophrictis Meyrick, 1934
Asymphorodes admiranda Meyrick, 1934
Asymphorodes adynatus J.F.G. Clarke, 1986
Asymphorodes aenigma J.F.G. Clarke, 1986
Asymphorodes albicoma J.F.G. Clarke, 1986
Asymphorodes amblysoma J.F.G. Clarke, 1986
Asymphorodes aporia J.F.G. Clarke, 1986
Asymphorodes balanotis Meyrick, 1934
Asymphorodes bipunctatus J.F.G. Clarke, 1986
Asymphorodes brevimacula J.F.G. Clarke, 1986
Asymphorodes canicoma J.F.G. Clarke, 1986
Asymphorodes chalcocoma J.F.G. Clarke, 1986
Asymphorodes chalcopterus J.F.G. Clarke, 1986
Asymphorodes chalcosoma J.F.G. Clarke, 1986
Asymphorodes chalcozona Meyrick, 1935
Asymphorodes chrysophanes J.F.G. Clarke, 1986
Asymphorodes cicatricula J.F.G. Clarke, 1986
Asymphorodes circopis Meyrick, 1928
Asymphorodes cirsodes Meyrick, 1928
Asymphorodes coesyrias Meyrick, 1928
Asymphorodes culminis J.F.G. Clarke, 1986
Asymphorodes cuneatus J.F.G. Clarke, 1986
Asymphorodes diamphidius J.F.G. Clarke, 1986
Asymphorodes didyma J.F.G. Clarke, 1986
Asymphorodes diffidentia J.F.G. Clarke, 1986
Asymphorodes emphereia J.F.G. Clarke, 1986
Asymphorodes ergodes Meyrick, 1934
Asymphorodes favilla J.F.G. Clarke, 1986
Asymphorodes fractura J.F.G. Clarke, 1986
Asymphorodes hemileucus J.F.G. Clarke, 1986
Asymphorodes holoporphyra Meyrick, 1934
Asymphorodes homosoma J.F.G. Clarke, 1986
Asymphorodes honoria J.F.G. Clarke, 1986
Asymphorodes hypostema J.F.G. Clarke, 1986
Asymphorodes ingravescens Meyrick, 1934
Asymphorodes interstincta Meyrick, 1928
Asymphorodes lenticula J.F.G. Clarke, 1986
Asymphorodes leptotes J.F.G. Clarke, 1986
Asymphorodes leucoloma J.F.G. Clarke, 1986
Asymphorodes leucoterma Meyrick, 1928
Asymphorodes lucerna J.F.G. Clarke, 1986
Asymphorodes lucidus J.F.G. Clarke, 1986
Asymphorodes macrogramma J.F.G. Clarke, 1986
Asymphorodes mediostriatus J.F.G. Clarke, 1986
Asymphorodes melanosoma J.F.G. Clarke, 1986
Asymphorodes mesoxanthus J.F.G. Clarke, 1986
Asymphorodes monoxesta Meyrick, 1928
Asymphorodes montgomeryi J.F.G. Clarke, 1986
Asymphorodes myronota Meyrick, 1928
Asymphorodes nebrias J.F.G. Clarke, 1986
Asymphorodes nephocirca Meyrick, 1928
Asymphorodes nigricornis J.F.G. Clarke, 1986
Asymphorodes nuciferae J.F.G. Clarke, 1986
Asymphorodes ochrogramma J.F.G. Clarke, 1986
Asymphorodes oculisignis Meyrick, 1934
Asymphorodes paraporia J.F.G. Clarke, 1986
Asymphorodes perfuga Meyrick, 1928
Asymphorodes phaeochorda Meyrick, 1928
Asymphorodes phaeodelta J.F.G. Clarke, 1986
Asymphorodes phalarogramma J.F.G. Clarke, 1986
Asymphorodes plectographa Meyrick, 1928
Asymphorodes plemmelia J.F.G. Clarke, 1986
Asymphorodes poliopterus J.F.G. Clarke, 1986
Asymphorodes polluta Meyrick, 1928
Asymphorodes porphyrarcha Meyrick, 1928
Asymphorodes remigiata J.F.G. Clarke, 1986
Asymphorodes regina J.F.G. Clarke, 1986
Asymphorodes semiluteus J.F.G. Clarke, 1986
Asymphorodes seminiger J.F.G. Clarke, 1986
Asymphorodes sericeus J.F.G. Clarke, 1986
Asymphorodes sphenocopa Meyrick, 1928
Asymphorodes spodogramma J.F.G. Clarke, 1986
Asymphorodes trichogramma J.F.G. Clarke, 1986
Asymphorodes trigrapha J.F.G. Clarke, 1986
Asymphorodes valligera Meyrick, 1928
Asymphorodes xanthostola Meyrick, 1934
Asymphorodes xestophanes Meyrick, 1934
Cosmopterix aphranassa Meyrick, 1926
Cosmopterix flavofasciata (E. Wollaston, 1879)
Cosmopterix melanarches Meyrick, 1928
Cosmopterix aphranassa Meyrick, 1926
Cosmopterix diandra (Clarke, 1986)
Cosmopterix nonna Clarke, 1986
Iressa microsema Clarke, 1986
Iressa neoleuca Clarke, 1971
Labdia ceriocosma Meyrick, 1934
Labdia dicyanitis Meyrick, 1934
Labdia leucoxantha Meyrick, 1927
Limnaecia astathopis Meyrick, 1934
Microzestis inelegans Meyrick, 1929
Pyroderces lunulifera Meyrick, 1934
Stagmatophora spintheropa Meyrick, 1934
Syntomaula simulatella (Walker, 1864)
Trissodoris honorariella (Walsingham, 1907)
Ulochora perfuga Meyrick, 1928

Crambidae
Aethaloessa floridalis (Zeller, 1852)
Archernis fulvalis Hampson, 1913
Bradina perlucidalis Hampson, 1897
Bradina tormentifera Meyrick, 1929
Calamochrous thermochra Meyrick, 1929
Chrysophyllis lucivaga Meyrick, 1934
Cnaphalocrocis creonalis (Walker, 1859)
Cnaphalocrocis hemicrossa (Meyrick, 1886)
Cnaphalocrocis poeyalis (Boisduval, 1833)
Cnaphalocrocis trapezalis (Guenée, 1854)
Crocidolomia binotalis Zeller, 1852
Diaphania indica (Saunders, 1851)
Diasemiopsis ramburialis (Duponchel, 1834)
Eudonia chrysomicta (Meyrick, 1929)
Eudonia citrocosma (Meyrick, 1929)
Eudonia clerica (Meyrick, 1929)
Eudonia officialis (Meyrick, 1929)
Eudonia opostactis (Meyrick, 1929)
Eurrhyparodes tricoloralis (Zeller, 1852)
Glyphodes multilinealis Kenrick, 1907
Glyphodes phormingopa (Meyrick, 1934)
Glyphodes psammocyma (Meyrick, 1929)
Glyphodes uranoptris (Meyrick, 1929)
Hellula undalis (Fabricius, 1781)
Herpetogramma cleoropa (Meyrick, 1934)
Herpetogramma licarsisalis (Walker, 1859)
Herpetogramma phthorosticta (Meyrick, 1929)
Herpetogramma stultalis (Walker, 1859)
Hyalobathra illectalis (Walker, 1859)
Hydriris ornatalis (Duponchel, 1832)
Idioblasta acleropa (Meyrick, 1934)
Idioblasta isoterma (Meyrick, 1934)
Idioblasta lacteata Warren, 1891
Idioblasta procellaris (Meyrick, 1934)
Idioblasta straminata Warren, 1891
Lamprosema foedalis (Guenée 1854)
Marasmianympha eupselias (Meyrick, 1929)
Maruca vitrata (Fabricius, 1787)
Omiodes diemenalis (Guenée, 1854)
Palpita bacteata (Warren, 1891)
Paratalanta aureolalis (Lederer, 1863)
Piletocera signiferalis (Wallengren, 1860)
Prophantis octoguttalis (Felder & Rogenhofer, 1875)
Pythagoraea categorica Meyrick, 1929
Scoparia chrysopetra Meyrick, 1929
Scoparia commercialis Meyrick, 1929
Scoparia exterminate Meyrick, 1929
Scoparia philorphna Meyrick, 1929
Scoparia psednopa Meyrick, 1929
Scoparia spectacularis Meyrick, 1929
Spoladea recurvalis (Fabricius, 1775)
Stemorrhages euthalassa (Meyrick, 1934)
Stemorrhages thetydalis (Guenée, 1854)
Sufetula hemiophthalma (Meyrick, 1884)
Tatobotys vibrata Meyrick, 1929

Gelechiidae
Pectinophora gossypiella (Saunders, 1843)
Phthorimaea operculella (Zeller, 1873)
Stoeberhinus testaceus Butler, 1881

Geometridae
Anisodes decolorata (Warren, 1897)
Anisodes niveopuncta (Warren, 1897)
Anisodes samoana (Warren, 1897)
Bosara montana Orhant, 2003
Chloroclystis ambundata Prout, 1929
Chloroclystis coloptila Prout, 1929
Chloroclystis lepta (Meyrick, 1886)
Chloroclystis pitoi Clarke, 1971
Chloroclystis torninubis Prout, 1929
Cleora albipuncta Orhant, 2003
Cleora caliginosa Orhant, 2003
Cleora collenettei Prout, 1929
Cleora dodonaeae Prout, 1929
Cleora esoterica Prout, 1929
Cleora esoterica pusillanimis Prout, 1933
Cleora leucostigma Prout, 1929
Cleora licornaria (Guenée, 1858)
Cleora longipectina Orhant, 2002
Cleora myrmidonaria (Guenée, 1858)
Cleora nitidula Orhant, 2002
Cleora stenoglypta Prout, 1929
Gymnoscelis concinna Swinhoe, 1902
Gymnoscelis erymna (Meyrick, 1886)
Gymnoscelis imparatalis (Walker, 1865)
Gymnoscelis tristrigosa Butler, 1881
Scopula angusticallis Prout, 1933
Scopula menytes Prout, 1933
Scopula oxystoma Prout, 1929
Scopula tahitiensis Orhant, 2003
Scopula tersicallis Prout, 1929
Thalassodes chloropsis Meyrick, 1886
Thalassodes microchloropis Holloway, 1979
Thalassodes pilaria Guenée, 1857

Gracillariidae
Caloptilia crypsidelta (Meyrick, 1926)
Caloptilia deltanthes (Meyrick, 1934)
Caloptilia hilaropis (Meyrick, 1926)
Epicephala colymbetella Meyrick 1880
Parectopa pontificalis Meyrick, 1928

Heliodinidae
Lissocnemitis argolyca Meyrick, 1934

Hyblaeidae
Hyblaea puera (Cramer, 1777)

Immidae
Imma catapsesta Meyrick, 1934
Imma chloroplintha Meyrick, 1928
Imma fulminatrix Meyrick, 1934
Imma oxypselia Meyrick, 1928
Imma semiclara Meyrick, 1928

Noctuidae
Acanthodelta marquesanus (Collenette, 1928)
Achaea janata (Linnaeus, 1758)
Achaea robinsoni Holloway 1982
Aedia sericea (Butler, 1882)
Agrotis ipsilon (Hufnagel, 1766)
Amyna natalis (Walker, 1858)
Amyna octo (Guenée, 1852)
Anigraea ochrobasis Hampson, 1912
Anomis flava (Fabricius, 1775)
Anomis involuta (Walker, 1858)
Anomis involuta vitiensis Butler, 1886
Anomis marauensis Orhant, 2002
Anomis sabulifera (Guenée, 1852)
Anticarsia irrorata (Fabricius, 1781)
Athetis nonagrica (Walker, 1863)
Athetis thoracica (Moore, 1884)
Athyrma discolor (Fabricius, 1794)
Bastilla insularum (Orhant, 2002)
Bastilla tahitiensis (Orhant, 2002)
Bastilla vitiensis (Butler, 1886)
Callopistria alticola Orhant, 2002
Callopistria maillardi (Guenée, 1862)
Callopistria ouria nanodes Collenette, 1934
Callopistria ouria ouria Collenette, 1928
Callopistria reticulata (Pagenstecher, 1884)
Callopistria steevei Orhant, 2002
Catephia linteola Guenée, 1852
Chasmina tibialis (Fabricius, 1775)
Chrysodeixis chalcites (Esper, 1789)
Chrysodeixis collardi (Orhant, 2002)
Chrysodeixis copiaria Orhant, 2003
Chrysodeixis eriosoma (Doubleday, 1843)
Condica conducta (Walker 1857)
Condica hollowayi Orhant 2003
Condica illecta (Walker, 1865)
Ctenoplusia albostriata (Bremer & Gray, 1853)
Earias huegeliana Gaede, 1937
Earias vittella (Fabricius, 1794)
Eublemma anachoresis (Wallengren, 1863)
Eublemma crassiuscula (Walker, 1864)
Eublemma rivula (Moore, 1882)
Eudocima fullonia (Clerck, 1764)
Eudocima materna (Linnaeus, 1767)
Euplexia vetula Clarke, 1971
Fautaua diagonalis Collenette, 1928
Fautaua innupta Collenette, 1928
Fautaua minor Orhant, 2003
Grammodes oculicola Walker, 1858
Helicoverpa armigera (Hübner, 1805)
Helicoverpa assulta (Guenée, 1852)
Hydrillodes crispipalpus Collenette, 1928
Hydrillodes epidela Orhant, 2003
Hydrillodes melanozona Collenette, 1928
Hydrillodes sechani Orhant, 2003
Hypena cracens Orhant, 2003
Hypena fulvifasciata Orhant, 2003
Hypena longfieldae Collenette, 1928
Hypena perexilis Orhant, 2003
Hypena sanctigeorgii Collenette, 1928
Hypena walkeri Collenette, 1928
Hypocala deflorata (Fabricius, 1793)
Lacera noctilio (Fabricius 1794)
Leucania loreyi (Duponchel, 1827)
Leucania stenographa Lower, 1900
Luceria oculalis (Moore, 1877)
Maliattha ritsemae (Snellen, 1880)
Mocis frugalis (Fabricius, 1775)
Mocis trifasciata (Stephens, 1829)
Mythimna mouai Orhant, 2002
Mythimna separata (Walker, 1865)
Nola insularum (Collenette, 1928)
Ophiusa coronata (Fabricius, 1775)
Parallelia marquesanus (Collenette, 1929)
Penicillaria jocosatrix Guenée, 1852
Polydesma boarmoides Guenée, 1852
Polydesma umbricola Boisduval, 1833
Prospalta serva (Walker, 1858)
Rhesalides curvata (Lucas, 1895)
Savoca divitalis (Walker, 1863)
Serrodes campana Guenée, 1852
Serrodes mediopallens Prout, 1924
Simplicia caeneusalis (Walker, 1858)
Spodoptera exempta (Walker, 1856)
Spodoptera litura (Fabricius, 1775)
Spodoptera mauritia (Boisduval, 1833)
Spodoptera retina (Freyer 1854)
Targalla delatrix (Guenée, 1852)
Tiracola plagiata (Walker, 1857)
Trichoplusia ni (Hübner, 1803)

Oecophoridae
Autosticha pelodes Meyrick, 1928
Stoeberhinus testaceus Butler, 1881

Plutellidae
Plutella xylostella (Linnaeus, 1758)

Pterophoridae
Marasmarcha pumilio (Zeller, 1873)

Pyralidae
Achroia grisella (Fabricius, 1793)
Acrobasis ptilophanes Meyrick, 1929
Assara albicostalis (Walker, 1863)
Assara halmophila (Meyrick, 1929)
Cryptoblabes ardescens (Meyrick, 1929)
Cryptoblabes plagioleuca Turner, 1904
Ctenomeristis ochrodepta Meyrick, 1929
Diaphania indica (Saunders, 1851)
Endotricha mesenterialis (Walker, 1859)
Ephestia kuehniella Zeller, 1879
Ernophthora chrysura (Meyrick, 1929)
Ernophthora denticornis (Meyrick, 1929)
Ernophthora dryinandra (Meyrick, 1929)
Ernophthora maculicostella (Ragonot, 1888)
Etiella drososcia Meyrick, 1929
Eucampyla inexplorata (Meyrick, 1929)
Herculia repitita Butler, 1885
Phycita orthoclina Meyrick, 1929

Sphingidae
Agrius convolvuli (Linnaeus, 1758)
Gnathothlibus collardi Haxaire, 2002
Gnathothlibus erotus (Cramer, 1777)
Gnathothlibus erotus eras (Boisduval, 1832)
Hippotion celerio (Linnaeus, 1758)
Macroglossum hirundo hirundo (Boisduval, 1832)
Macroglossum marquesanum Collenette, 1935
Philodila astyanor (Boisduval, 1875)

Stathmopodidae
Stathmopoda cryptophaea Meyrick, 1922

Tineidae
Erechthias clistopa (Meyrick, 1928)
Erechthias coleosema (Meyrick, 1934)
Erechthias flavistriata Walsingham, 1907
Erechthias minuscule (Walsingham, 1897)
Erechthias pelotricha (Meyrick, 1926)
Erechthias percnomicta (Meyrick, 1934)
Erechthias physocapna (Meyrick, 1928)
Erechthias praedatrix (Meyrick, 1934)
Erechthias psammaula (Meyrick, 1921)
Erechthias rufimacula (Meyrick, 1934)
Erechthias simulans (Butler, 1882)
Erechthias sphenacma (Meyrick, 1926)
Erechthias strangulate (Meyrick, 1928)
Erechthias zebrine (Butler, 1881)
Opogona aurisquamosa (Butler, 1881)
Opogona punctata (Walsingham, 1900)
Opogona trissostacta Meyrick, 1934
Pisistrata trypheropa Meyrick, 1924
Praeacedes atomosella (Walker, 1863)
Tinea monospila Meyrick, 1928
Trachycentra calamias Meyrick, 1886

Tortricidae
Bactra litigatrix Meyrick, 1928
Crocidosema plebejana Zeller, 1847
Cryptophlebia chaomorpha (Meyrick, 1928)
Cryptophlebia pallifimbriana Bradley, 1953
Cryptophlebia rhynchias (Meyrick, 1928)
Dichelopa amorpha Clarke, 1986
Dichelopa argema Clarke, 1986
Dichelopa argoschista Meyrick, 1929
Dichelopa argosphena Meyrick, 1934
Dichelopa canitia Clarke, 1986
Dichelopa castanopis Meyrick, 1934
Dichelopa ceramocausta Meyrick, 1926
Dichelopa chionogramma Clarke, 1986
Dichelopa choleranthes Meyrick, 1928
Dichelopa cirrhodoris Meyrick, 1934
Dichelopa deltozancla Meyrick, 1926
Dichelopa dorsata Clarke, 1986
Dichelopa dryomorpha Meyrick, 1928
Dichelopa exulcerata Meyrick, 1926
Dichelopa flexura Clarke, 1986
Dichelopa fulvistrigata Meyrick, 1928
Dichelopa gnoma Clarke, 1986
Dichelopa hadrotes Clarke, 1986
Dichelopa harmodes Meyrick, 1928
Dichelopa honoranda Meyrick, 1926
Dichelopa iochorda Meyrick, 1926
Dichelopa meligma Clarke, 1986
Dichelopa ochroma Clarke, 1986
Dichelopa orthiostyla Meyrick, 1934
Dichelopa pachydmeta Meyrick, 1928
Dichelopa paragnoma Clarke, 1986
Dichelopa peropaea Meyrick, 1928
Dichelopa phalaranthes Meyrick, 1934
Dichelopa platyxantha Clarke, 1986
Dichelopa porphyrophanes Meyrick, 1934
Dichelopa praestrigata Meyrick, 1928
Dichelopa pyrsogramma Meyrick, 1934
Dichelopa sericopis Meyrick, 1926
Dichelopa zona Clarke, 1986
Dudua aprobola (Meyrick, 1886)
Dudua eumenica (Meyrick, 1928)
Eucosma agriochlora Meyrick, 1929
Nesoscopa exsors Meyrick, 1926
Strepsicrates dilacerate (Meyrick, 1928)
Strepsicrates holotephras (Meyrick, 1924)
Strepsicrates thyellopis (Meyrick, 1926)
Tritopterna eocnephaea (Meyrick, 1934)

Yponomeutidae 
Prays nephelomima Meyrick, 1907
Simaethus orthogona (Meyrick, 1886)
Zelleria leucostrota Meyrick, 1928

References

External links 
 Essig Museum of Entomology Collections - French Polynesia Checklists
 Lepidoptera of French Polynesia database

French Polynesia
French Polynesia, Lepidoptera
French Polynesia, Lepidoptera
French Polynesia
Lepidoptera
Polynesia
Lepidoptera